This is a list of countries and dependent territories named after people.

Sovereign countries named after people

Countries named after legendary figures

Former countries named after people

Dependent territories named after people

See also 
List of country name etymologies
List of country subdivisions named after people

References

Named after people
Countries named after people
Countries named after people